Egerton Attiser Rolland Forster (born 31 October 1959) is a Sierra Leonean former boxer. He competed in the men's heavyweight event at the 1984 Summer Olympics.

References

External links
 

1959 births
Living people
Sierra Leonean male boxers
Olympic boxers of Sierra Leone
Boxers at the 1984 Summer Olympics
Place of birth missing (living people)
Heavyweight boxers
Sierra Leone Creole people